The Arizona Science Center, at 600 East Washington Street in downtown Phoenix, Arizona, is a science museum located in Heritage and Science Park.  It was founded in 1984 as the Arizona Museum of Science & Technology in a downtown storefront, Its current building, designed by Antoine Predock, was completed in 1997. Along with daily demonstrations throughout the Center, the Center provides shows in the Dorrance Planetarium and in a five-story, giant screen IMAX Theater.

History 
Arizona Science Center, formerly the Arizona Museum of Science & Technology, was conceived in 1980 as a pilot science center by the Junior League of Phoenix. The Science Center opened its doors to the public in 1984 as a small  storefront exhibition space located in the parking garage level of the downtown Phoenix Hyatt. The Science Center’s first year of operation saw more than 87,000 visitors. When the Science Center moved to its present location, Heritage Square was renamed Heritage and Science Park.

Among the museum's best-known programs is the annual Snow Week.

In 2009, the museum reached an agreement with the adjacent, closed Phoenix Museum of History to showcase their collection.

As of March 2022, Guy Labine is the museum's president and CEO.

References

External links 

 

Buildings and structures in Phoenix, Arizona
Planetaria in the United States
Museums in Phoenix, Arizona
Science museums in Arizona
Antoine Predock buildings